Hyŏpyul-sa (협률사) was the first modern theatre of Korea, supported by the Korean Empire from 1902 until its closing.

Before 1902, Korean theatre took the forms of outdoor performance and folk theatre. In that year of 1902, the Hyŏpyul-sa was established as the first modern indoor theatre in Korea, where they staged dramatized stories in Pansori musical styles. This reformed style of Pansori was a kind of opera or music drama called Changgeuk. Later, with strong financial support, it overpowered other private theatres and exercised great influence on other theatres. 

As the theatre began to evolve from outdoor to indoor, the style of theatre was also transformed. That change was necessary because the style of outdoor theatre was limited spatially, especially when it came into an enclosed space. As the modern theatre grew, new types of theatre appeared later on.

References 

Korean Empire
Theatres in Korea